Mike Jorgensen is a former American football quarterback and is currently a radio color commentator for the Oregon Ducks football team.

Playing career
Jorgensen was a star high school quarterback and basketball player at Ontario High School in Ontario, Oregon. He was recruited to play football for the University of Oregon, and earned the starting job at quarterback in the 1983 season after success leading the Ducks at the end of the 1982 season. Toward the end of the 1982 season, Jorgensen broke his leg and was replaced by Chris Miller. He was initially named the starter for the 1984 season, but after struggling in the first game of the season, Miller took over the starting duties.

Broadcasting career
In 1989, Jorgensen became a color commentator for the Ducks football radio broadcasts. He also served as president of an insurance company based in Medford, Oregon.

References

Year of birth missing (living people)
Living people
People from Ontario, Oregon
Sportspeople from Medford, Oregon
American football quarterbacks
Oregon Ducks football players
Oregon Ducks football announcers
American sports radio personalities